General elections were held in Greenland on 26 May 1987. Siumut and Atassut both won 11 seats in the 27-seat Parliament.

Results

References

Elections in Greenland
Greenland
1987 in Greenland